Anni Laakmann (born 5 January 1937) is a German chess player who holds the title of Woman FIDE Master (WFM, 1983). She is a four time West Germany Women's Chess Champion (1970, 1972, 1974, 1976).

Biography
In 1970s, Laakmann was one of West Germany's leading women chess players. She won the West Germany Women's Chess Championships four times in 1970, 1972, 1974 and 1976. In 1973, in Nordic Chess Cup Laakmann won all her games. In 1975, in Pula she participated in the World Women's Chess Championship Zonal tournament.

Anni Laakmann played for Germany in the Women's Chess Olympiads:
 In 1972, at first board in the 5th Chess Olympiad (women) in Skopje (+3, =4, -3),
 In 1974, at first board in the 6th Chess Olympiad (women) in Medellín (+4, =4, -5),
 In 1976, at first board in the 7th Chess Olympiad (women) in Haifa (+4, =4, -2),
 In 1978, at first board in the 8th Chess Olympiad (women) in Buenos Aires (+2, =5, -4) and won the team bronze medal,
 In 1980, at third board in the 9th Chess Olympiad (women) in Valletta (+4, =3, -2),
 In 1982, at first reserve board in the 10th Chess Olympiad (women) in Lucerne (+2, =1, -2).

In mid 1980s Laakmann finished her chess player career.

References

External links

Anni Laakmann chess games at 365Chess.com

1937 births
People from Wesel (district)
Sportspeople from Düsseldorf (region)
German female chess players
Chess Woman FIDE Masters
Chess Olympiad competitors
Living people